Human rights are "rights and freedoms to which all humans are entitled". Proponents of the concept usually assert that everyone is endowed with certain entitlements merely by reason of being human.

Ghana is a sovereign country in West Africa. It was a British colony until 6th March 1957, when it became the first country, south of the Sahara to gain independence.

LGBT rights 

LGBT rights in Ghana are heavily suppressed. Physical and violent attacks against homosexual people are common, often encouraged by the media and religious and political leaders. Reports of young gay men being kicked out of their homes are also common. Despite the Constitution guaranteeing a right to freedom of speech, of expression, and of assembly to Ghanaian citizens, these fundamental rights are actively denied to LGBT people, especially for those who are homosexual.

Religious freedom

Freedom of the press 

Although the constitution and law provide for freedom of speech and press, the government sometimes restricts those rights. The police arbitrarily arrest and detain journalists. Some journalists practise self-censorship. The constitution prohibits arbitrary interference with privacy, family, home, or correspondence, and the government respects these prohibitions in practice.

In 2002 the government of Ghana censored Internet media coverage of tribal violence in Northern Ghana.

Prison conditions 

Squalid conditions, poor food, and overcrowding in Ghana's prisons were called "cruel, inhuman and degrading treatment," by the UN in 2013. The extent of prison overcrowding is estimated to be higher than the government's official figures. Prison authorities use a system where inmates known as "black coats" whip other misbehaving prisoners with canes.

Historical situation
The following chart shows Ghana's ratings since 1972 in the Freedom in the World reports, published annually by Freedom House. A rating of 1 is "most free" and 7 is "least free".

International treaties
Ghana's stances on international human rights treaties are as follows:

See also
 Internet censorship and surveillance in Ghana
 Women in Ghana

Notes 
1.Note that the "Year" signifies the "Year covered". Therefore the information for the year marked 2008 is from the report published in 2009, and so on.
2.As of January 1.
3.The 1982 report covers the year 1981 and the first half of 1982, and the following 1984 report covers the second half of 1982 and the whole of 1983. In the interest of simplicity, these two aberrant "year and a half" reports have been split into three year-long reports through interpolation.

References

External links
 2012 Annual Report , by Amnesty International
 Freedom in the World 2012 Report , by Freedom House

 
Politics of Ghana